Cave of Zubialde is a prehistoric cave located in Zubialde, Gorbea, Spain. In 1990 it was subjected to an authentication by the use of electron microscopy, chromatography and absolute dating, so it was defined as a black and red liquid painting.

It was discovered in 1990 by Serafín Ruiz, a history student, and it was decorated by 20 animal figurines and 49 hand symbols. It was the best prehistoric discovery of the decade and the most important of País Vasco. It was dated in the Magdalenian, Upper Paleolithic (13.000 to 10.000 BC).

In the same year, Peter Ucko, from the University of Southampton, and Jill Cook, from British Museum suspected they were fake, and the Ertzaintza found out someone had painted the cave during 1990, and the main suspect was Serafín Ruiz.

In 2008 another fraud was discovered in Iruña-Veleia similar to Zubialde.

References 

Archaeological forgeries
Cave paintings
Rock art in Spain